Ibrahim Suhaimi (born 3 October 1979) is a Malaysian field hockey player. He competed in the men's tournament at the 2000 Summer Olympics.

References

External links
 

1979 births
Living people
Malaysian male field hockey players
Olympic field hockey players of Malaysia
Field hockey players at the 2000 Summer Olympics
Place of birth missing (living people)
Commonwealth Games medallists in field hockey
Commonwealth Games silver medallists for Malaysia
Field hockey players at the 1998 Commonwealth Games
Medallists at the 1998 Commonwealth Games